Ro-1 may refer to:

 , an Imperial Japanese Navy submarine commissioned in 1920 and stricken in 1932
 Romeo Ro.1, an Italian license-built version of the Fokker C.V aircraft
 Type F submarine, an Imperial Japanese Navy submarine class whose F1 subclass sometimes is called the Ro-1 class